Petter Gabriel Wickenberg, known as Pehr (1 October 1812- 19 December 1846) was a Swedish painter and designer who specialized in landscapes with figures.

Biography
Wickenberg was born in Malmö, Sweden. He was the son of  Jonas Wickenberg and his wife Katharina Isberg. His father was an officer (fanjunkare) in the Swedish Army. He showed an early talent for drawing and painting and began taking private lessons when he was thirteen. After completing his secondary education in 1830, he helped support his family by selling goods from the barges in Malmö. The following year, friends and family took up a collection and raised enough money for him to enroll at the Royal Swedish Academy of Fine Arts.

Despite the assistance, after a time in Stockholm he found himself in financial difficulty. This was lessened somewhat when he was offered lodging with the family of Michael  Anckarsvärd (1742-1838), a military officer who was also a part-time artist. To complete his studies, he earned some money by colorizing the illustrations of naval officer  (1783-1848) for publication in Ett år i Sverige. 

He also received support from Johan Gustaf Sandberg (1782–1854) which proved critical, as well as from the new Swedish Association for Art (Sveriges allmänna konstförening) which had been founded in 1832.

In 1836, he developed some type of eye disease. Once again, members of the Anckarsvärd family came to his rescue and collected the funds necessary for him to visit the spa in Töplitz for a cure. After his recovery, he spent some time in Berlin with the scenic artist and decorator, Karl Wilhelm Gropius (1793–1870).

Soon after, he went to Paris where he shared a studio with the artist Olof Johan Södermark (1790-1848), until he was able to afford his own on the Rue Saint-Honoré. He soon attracted a wealthy clientele and was able to obtain a larger studio on the  Rue de la Bienfaisance in  Paris. In 1838, he was awarded a gold medal at the Paris Salon. The following year, he was named a member candidate  (agré) at the Royal Academy of Painting and Sculpture (Académie royale de peinture et de sculpture) and received full membership in 1842, the same year he was awarded the Royal Order of Vasa in Sweden.

He had been travelling around France and the Low Countries and in 1843 had a brief stay in London. During this time, he suffered from increasingly poor health and his eye disorder recurred every year, leaving him unable to paint. When he was diagnosed with tuberculosis, he moved to Nice, then to the Pyrenees mountain resort of Eaux-Bonnes seeking a cure. It was to no avail and he died in nearby Pau in 1846, aged only thirty-four.

His works may be seen at the Nationalmuseum, Nordiska museet, Uppsala University Library, Lund University Library and the Musée du Luxembourg, among many others.

Gallery

References

Other sources
 Kruse, John (1901) Petter Gabriel Wickenberg, 1812-1846, ett konstnärsporträtt (Stockholm: Ivar Haeggström)

Further reading
Pehr Wickenberg : Prins Eugens Waldemarsudde (exhibition catalog,4 november - 5 december 1976), Stockholm
Svenskt konstnärslexikon Part V, pgs. 659-660, Allhems Förlag, Malmö

External links
  
Kruse, John: Petter Gabriel Wickenberg : 1812-1846  : ett konstnärsporträtt, 'Sveriges allmänna konstförenings' series. Digitalized @ Project Runeberg
 Biography from the Svenskt biografiskt handlexikon @ Project Runeberg
 Biography & critical appreciation from the Svenska Familj-Journalen, Vol.16, @ Project Runeberg
 More works by Wickenberg @ ArtNet

1812 births
1846 deaths
People from Malmö
19th-century Swedish painters
19th-century male artists
Swedish landscape painters
Swedish emigrants to France
19th-century deaths from tuberculosis
Members of the Académie royale de peinture et de sculpture
Recipients of the Order of Vasa
Tuberculosis deaths in France